The sixteenth season of American Dad! aired on TBS from April 15, 2019, to April 27, 2020.


Episode list

References

2019 American television seasons
2020 American television seasons
American Dad! (season 16) episodes